The 2001 WNBA season was the fifth season for the New York Liberty. The team attempted to reach the WNBA Finals, but they failed in the conference finals, losing in three games to the Charlotte Sting.

Offseason

WNBA Draft

Regular season

Season schedule

Playoffs

Player stats

References

New York Liberty seasons
New York
New York Liberty